First acquired in 1977, Big Lagoon State Park is a  Florida State Park located on the northwestern Florida coast, approximately  southwest of Pensacola on Gulf Beach Highway.  It encompasses the northern boundary of Big Lagoon as it snakes toward Pensacola Bay to the east.  Wild Grande Lagoon and its minor tributaries lay within the boundaries of the park, as does the alligator-inhabited Long Pond, a man-made freshwater pond.

The park includes several archaeological sites. Park development in the 1980s partially disturbed a middens from the Woodland period. This and other evidence points to historical use of this maritime habitat to forage on abundant shell fish.

The park is a 'gateway site' for the Great Florida Birding Trail.  It features nine distinct natural communities including estuarine tidal marsh, mesic flatwoods, wet flatwoods, and is dominated by scrubby flatwoods.  The park features a number of threatened and endangered species such as the large-leaved jointweed, gopher tortoise, migratory shorebirds such as snowy plover, least tern among some twenty other listed species.

From Big Lagoon, the Florida Park Service manages two neighboring state parks - Perdido Key State Park to the southwest and Tarkiln Bayou Preserve State Park to the north.

Recreational activities
The park has such amenities as beaches along the shoreline of Big Lagoon, bicycling down the  park drive, boating from a boat ramp on the Intracoastal Waterway, canoeing along Big Lagoon, fishing, hiking along  of trails, kayaking in Grande Lagoon, wildlife viewing from a four-story observation tower and footbridge overlooks at Long Pond and Grande Lagoon, picnicking at 17 shelters, swimming in Big Lagoon and 75 electrified camping sites and a group camp.

Gallery

References

External links

 Big Lagoon State Park at Florida State Parks
 Photos of Big Lagoon State Park

State parks of Florida
Parks in Escambia County, Florida
Pensacola metropolitan area
Beaches of Florida
Protected areas established in 1977
Beaches of Escambia County, Florida
1977 establishments in Florida